Marshal of Italy Luigi Cadorna,  (4 September 1850 – 21 December 1928) was an Italian general, Marshal of Italy and Count most famous for being the Chief of Staff of the Italian Army from 1914-1917 of World War I.

Early career

Luigi Cadorna was born to General Raffaele Cadorna in Verbania Pallanza, Piedmont in 1850. In 1860 Cadorna became a student at the "Teuliè" Military School in Milan. At fifteen he entered the Turin Military Academy. Upon graduation he was commissioned as a second lieutenant of artillery in 1868. In 1870, as an officer in the 2nd Regiment of Artillery, Cadorna participated in the occupation of Rome as part of a force commanded by his father. As major he was appointed to the staff of General Pianell, afterwards taking the post of Chief of Staff of the Verona Divisional Command. As Colonel commanding the 10th Regiment of Bersaglieri from 1892 Cadorna acquired a reputation for strict discipline and harsh punishment. He wrote a manual of infantry tactics which laid stress on the doctrine of the offensive. Promoted to lieutenant general in 1898 Cadorna subsequently held a number of senior staff and divisional/corps command positions. On the eve of Italy's entry into World War (1915) he was close to peace-time retirement age and had a history of differences with his political and military superiors.

Cadorna had been offered the post of Chief of Staff for the first time in 1908, which he had rejected over the issue of political control during wartime. He was again offered the position in July 1914, as the Triple Entente and Central Powers girded for war. When Italy entered the war in May 1915 on the side of the Entente, Cadorna fielded thirty-six infantry divisions composed of 875,000 men, but with only 120 modern artillery pieces.

First World War

Cadorna inherited a difficult political and military situation. The government of Premier Antonio Salandra favored initial neutrality over Italy's treaty commitments under the Triple Alliance. Cadorna was accordingly obliged to reverse long established strategic plans while discovering that the army was ill-prepared for war against Austria-Hungary and Germany. In particular large numbers of men and quantities of equipment had been deployed to Tripolitania leaving the home army disorganized.

Cadorna launched four offensives in 1915, all along the Isonzo River. The goal of these offensives was the fortress of Gorizia, the capture of which would permit the Italian armies to pivot south and march on Trieste, or continue on to the Ljubljana Gap. Many offensives failed, resulting in some 250,000 Italian casualties before capturing the city in 1916. Cadorna would ultimately fight eleven battles on the Isonzo between 1915 and 1917, comprising one outright victory, six tactical victories or limited advances, three inconclusive offensives and one defeat. Additional forces were arrayed along the Trentino salient, attacking towards Rovereto, Trento, and Bolzano. These attacks also failed. The terrain along the Isonzo and Trentino was completely unsuited for offensive warfare–mountainous and broken, with no room for maneuver.

On 24 October 1917 a combined Austro-Hungarian/German army struck across the Isonzo at Kobarid (called Caporetto in Italian) and by 12 November had advanced all the way to the Piave River. Cadorna's disposition of most of his troops far forward, with little defense in depth, contributed greatly to the Defeat at Caporetto; but graver still were the responsibilities of other officers, notably Pietro Badoglio, then corps commander in a sector overrun by the Austro-German attack. Cadorna himself had been on leave for most of October and his immediate subordinate was seriously ill.

The Italian Army retreated in disarray and seemed on the verge of total collapse; 275,000 soldiers were captured. Italy's allies Britain and France insisted on the dismissal of Cadorna (the General was relieved of command on 9 November 1917)  and sent eleven divisions to reinforce the Italian front. However, these troops played no role in stemming the advancing Germans and Austro-Hungarians, because they were deployed on the Mincio River, some 97 kilometres (60 mi) behind the Piave, as the British and French strategists did not believe the Piave line could be held.

The king appointed the respected General Armando Diaz as Chief of General Staff, with Badoglio named as his second-in-command. Cadorna was reassigned as the Italian representative to the Allied Supreme War Council set up in Versailles.

The restored Italian defensive line was held during the subsequent Battle of the Piave River and later served as springboard for the Battle of Vittorio Veneto, where the Austro-Hungarian army was finally defeated, after eleven days of resistance, by 51 Italian divisions, 3 British divisions, 2 French divisions, 1 Czechoslovak Division, and 1 U.S. Infantry Regiment. The Italians and their allies captured 426,000 enemy soldiers.

Post-war

After the war, the Italian government held an inquiry to investigate the defeat at Caporetto. It was published in 1919 and was highly critical of Cadorna, at that time a bitter man busy with writing his own memoirs. Cadorna claimed that he had no responsibility for the defeat, despite fleeing to Padua during the battle and abandoning the entire Italian Second Army to its fate. Nevertheless, he was made a Field Marshal (Maresciallo d'Italia) in 1924 after Benito Mussolini seized power.

Cadorna died in Bordighera in 1928.

Personal reputation

Several historians record Cadorna as an unimaginative martinet who was ruthless with his troops and dismissive of his country's political authorities. David Stevenson, Professor of International History at the London School of Economics, describes him as earning "opprobrium as one of the most callous and incompetent of First World War commanders." In manner he appeared a reserved and aristocratic officer of the old-fashioned Piedmontese school. 
During the course of the war Cadorna dismissed 217 officers, and during the Battle of Caporetto, he ordered the summary execution of officers whose units retreated. Six percent of Italian soldiers under his leadership faced a disciplinary charge during the war and 61% of those charged were found guilty. About 750 were executed, the highest number in any army in World War I. Claims have been made that he also reintroduced the ancient Roman practice of decimation—the killing of every tenth man—for units which failed to perform in battle. However, the military historian John Keegan records that his "judicial savagery" took the form of the summary executions of individual stragglers rather than the formalized winnowing of entire detachments.  Because of the multiple and consecutive failed attacks led by him, the large number of casualties incurred among his own men and his personal reputation as disproportionately bitter and ruthless, Cadorna is often considered one of the  worst generals of World War I.

Other historians have a more balanced view of Luigi Cadorna. They argue that, in terms of military tactics, he was a typical general of his generation. It is also claimed that Cadorna's outdated tactics contrasted with his more innovative and effective military logistics. Cadorna was held in regard by fellow allied commanders prior to his failure at the Battle of Caporetto. His reputation reached its height in 1916, after the victories at the battles of Asiago and Gorizia, but subsequent allegations of the introduction of ancient Roman decimation alienated him from his troops. It was argued that the quasi-absolute power he assumed over the Italian army and the harsh discipline that he imposed on his soldiers was largely derived from his own strong sense of duty.

Family

He was the father of Raffaele Cadorna, Jr, an Italian general who fought during World War I and World War II, who was famous as one of the commanders of the Italian Resistance against German occupying forces in north Italy after 1943.

Notes

References

Other Sources

External links 
 
Luigi Cadorna on First World War.com
 
 Anna Grillini: Carorna, Luigi, in: 1914-1918-online. International Encyclopedia of the First World War.

1850 births
1928 deaths
People from Pallanza
Italian generals
Field marshals of Italy
Honorary Knights Grand Cross of the Order of the Bath
Italian military personnel of World War I
Members of the Senate of the Kingdom of Italy
20th-century Italian politicians
Italian front (World War I)